Serena Williams defeated Agnieszka Radwańska in the final, 6–1, 5–7, 6–2 to win the ladies' singles tennis title at the 2012 Wimbledon Championships. It was her fifth Wimbledon singles title (tying her for the third-most Wimbledon singles titles in the Open Era with her sister Venus) and her 14th major singles title overall. Radwańska became the first Pole to reach a major singles final since Jadwiga Jędrzejowska in 1939, and the first in the Open Era.

Petra Kvitová was the defending champion, but lost in the quarterfinals to Williams. With the losses of Maria Sharapova and Kim Clijsters in the fourth round, a first time finalist was guaranteed at the top half of the draw.

Yaroslava Shvedova became the first player in the Open Era to win a 'golden set' at Wimbledon, winning the first set of her 6–0, 6–4 victory over the defending French Open runner-up and 10th seed Sara Errani in the third round without dropping a single point.

Sabine Lisicki defeated the reigning French Open champion (world No. 1 Sharapova) en route to the Wimbledon quarterfinals for the third straight time. She previously defeated Li Na in 2011 and Svetlana Kuznetsova in 2009, and missed the 2010 Championships due to injury.

Victoria Azarenka regained the world No. 1 ranking by reaching the quarterfinals after Sharapova failed to reach the final. Four of the top five seeds were in contention for the top ranking.

Seeds

  Maria Sharapova (fourth round)
  Victoria Azarenka (semifinals)
  Agnieszka Radwańska (final)
  Petra Kvitová (quarterfinals)
  Samantha Stosur (second round)
  Serena Williams (champion)
  Caroline Wozniacki (first round)
  Angelique Kerber (semifinals)
  Marion Bartoli (second round)
  Sara Errani (third round)
  Li Na (second round)
  Vera Zvonareva (third round, retired)
  Dominika Cibulková (first round)
  Ana Ivanovic (fourth round)
  Sabine Lisicki (quarterfinals)
  Flavia Pennetta (first round)

  Maria Kirilenko (quarterfinals)
  Jelena Janković (first round)
  Lucie Šafářová (first round)
  Nadia Petrova (third round)
  Roberta Vinci (fourth round)
  Julia Görges (third round)
  Petra Cetkovská (second round)
  Francesca Schiavone (fourth round)
  Zheng Jie (third round)
  Anabel Medina Garrigues (second round)
  Daniela Hantuchová (first round)
  Christina McHale (third round)
  Monica Niculescu (first round)
  Peng Shuai (fourth round)
  Anastasia Pavlyuchenkova (second round)
  Svetlana Kuznetsova (first round)

Qualifying

Draw

Finals

Top half

Section 1

Section 2

Section 3

Section 4

Bottom half

Section 5

Section 6

Section 7

Section 8

Championship match statistics

References

External links

2012 Wimbledon Championships on WTAtennis.com
2012 Wimbledon Championships – Women's draws and results at the International Tennis Federation

Women's Singles
Wimbledon Championship by year – Women's singles
Wimbledon Championships
Wimbledon Championships